is a Japanese film director.

Filmography

Film
 Umizaru (2004)
 Limit of Love: Umizaru (2006)
 Oppai Volleyball (2008)
 Umizaru 3: The Last Message (2010)
 Wild 7 (2011)
 Brave Hearts: Umizaru (2012)
 Assassination Classroom
 Mozu (2015)
 Assassination Classroom: Graduation (2016)
 Over Drive (2018)
 The Sun Stands Still (2020)
 Resident Evil: Infinite Darkness (2021)
 Re/Member (2022)
 Resident Evil: Death Island (2023)

TV series
 Antique Bakery (2001)
 Umizaru Evolution (2005)

References

External links

1967 births
Japanese film directors
Living people